Gyrocotylidea is an order of Cestoda (tapeworms). Members of this order are parasites of vertebrates, living in the coelom (the body cavity).

References

Cestoda
Platyhelminthes orders
Taxa named by Franz Poche